Henry Staples Foster (1809 – 4 February 1868) was an English first-class cricketer and brewer who later served as Mayor of Cambridge.

Biography
The son of the Richard Foster and Sophia Staples, he was born at Cambridge in 1809. A prominent Cambridge cricketer, Foster played first-class cricket for Cambridge Town Club from 1844 to 1848, making five appearances. Cambridge Town Club played under various names, with Foster making four appearances for it as Cambridge Town and County Club and one appearance for it as Cambridge Townsmen. For Cambridge Town Club, Foster scored 48 runs with a highest score of 17. He also later made two first-class appearances for the Marylebone Cricket Club against Cambridge University in 1849 and 1850. He was by profession a brewer and a wine and spirits merchant. Foster was one of the opponents of Income Tax in Cambridge, chairing a meeting to its opposition in February 1843. He was elected mayor of Cambridge in 1849. Foster died at Great Yarmouth in February 1868.

References

External links

1809 births
1868 deaths
Cricketers from Cambridgeshire
Sportspeople from Cambridge
English brewers
English cricketers
Cambridge Town Club cricketers
Marylebone Cricket Club cricketers
Mayors of Cambridge